Kim Eun-sook (born 31 March 1963 in Seoul, South Korea) is a South Korean former basketball player who competed in the 1984 Summer Olympics.

References

1963 births
Living people
South Korean women's basketball players
Basketball players at the 1984 Summer Olympics
Medalists at the 1984 Summer Olympics
Olympic basketball players of South Korea
Olympic silver medalists for South Korea
Olympic medalists in basketball
Basketball players at the 1986 Asian Games
Asian Games medalists in basketball
Asian Games silver medalists for South Korea
Medalists at the 1986 Asian Games